Romuald Drobaczyński  (12 November 1930 – 19 June 2012, Gdańsk, Poland) was a Polish film director who also worked in film dubbing. In 1959, he graduated from the directing department at the National Film School in Łódź.

Director of dubbing 
 1998: Scooby Doo on Zombie Island
 1995-1997: Freakazoid!
 1979: Scooby Doo Goes Hollywood
 1972: Gentlemen of Fortune
 1971: Êtes-vous fiancée à un marin grec ou à un pilote de ligne ?
 1971: Dívka na koštěti
 1971: Młynarczyk i kotka
 1970: Kapitan Korda
 1970: Uncle Vanya
 1970: The Twelve Chairs
 1969-1972: Scooby Doo, Where Are You!
 1969: Kochanka buntownika
 1969: Ring of Bright Water
 1969: The Brothers Karamazov
 1969: We'll Live Till Monday
 1969: Run Wild, Run Free
 1969: Die Lederstrumpferzählungen
 1968: Brat doktora Homera
 1967: Szevasz, Vera!
 1966: Anděl blažené smrti
 1966: Born Free
 1964: Gde ty teper, Maksim?
 1964: Follow Me, Scoundrels
 1963: Slepaja ptica
 1963: Janosik
 1963: All remains to people
 1963: Inspektorat i noshtta
 1963: Koroleva benzokolonki
 1963: Strach
 1963: The Wrong Arm of the Law
 1962: Amphibian Man
 1962: The Prince and the Pauper
 1961: Parce plavog neba
 1961: Harry and the Butler
 1961: V nachale veka
 1960: Hunted in Holland
 1959: Tajemniczy szyfr
 1958: H-8
 1958: Udivitelnaya istoriya, pokhozhaya na skazki
 1958: Skrzynki na start
 1957: Wieczór kawalerski
 1957: Otryad Trubachyova srazhayetsya
 1957: Two Confessions
 1956: Herbaciarnia "Pod Księżycem"
 1956: Ora H
 1953: Piotruś Pan
 1952: La Minute de vérité
 1950: Wszystko o Ewie
Along with:
 Dwie strony medalu
 Ali and the Camel
 Handlarze opium
 Przystanek komisariat
 Please Turn Over
 Ot semi do dvenadtsati (kinoalmanakh)
 Barbara the Fair with the Silken Hair
 Listy miłosne

Director 
 1967: Pieczona gęś
 1962: Jadą goście jadą...
 1958: Miasteczko<ref>Miasteczko

Secondary director 
 1988-1991: Pogranicze w ogniu
 1985: Urwisy z Doliny Młynów
 1985: Rajska jabłoń
 1983: Lata dwudzieste... lata trzydzieste...
 1980-2000: Dom
 1978: Życie na gorąco
 1975: Kazimierz Wielki
 1973: Nie będę Cię kochać

Writer 
 1958: Miasteczko

Actor 
 1988-1991: Pogranicze w ogniu − Dyrektor polskiego wywiadu
 1987: Misja specjalna − Aktor
 1985: Dziewczęta z Nowolipek − Policjant
 1983: Lata dwudzieste... lata trzydzieste... − Żwirski, dyrektor teatru "Miraż"
 1980-2000: Dom − Professor Politechniki, wykładowca Andrzeja
 1978: Życie na gorąco − Radca ambasady austriackiej w Budapeszcie
 1975: Kazimierz Wielki
 1973: The Hourglass Sanatorium
 1969: Rzeczpospolita babska − Bukała
 1969: Księżyc − Białogwardzista
 1962: Jadą goście jadą... − Mieszkaniec Orawki
 1958: Miasteczko − Strażak

References

External links
 
 Romuald Drobaczyński at FilmWeb
 Romuald Drobaczyński at FilmPolski
 Romuald Drobaczyński at E-teatr
 Photos of Romuald Drobaczyński

Łódź Film School alumni
Polish male film actors
Polish film directors
1930 births
2012 deaths
Film people from Gdańsk